Kellory the Warlock is a fix-up fantasy novel by American writer Lin Carter, the third book of the Chronicles of Kylix series. Its seven episodic chapters were originally written as short stories, but only one, "In the Valley of Silence," had been previously published (as "Vault of Silence," in the anthology Swords Against Tomorrow (1970)). The book was first published in hardcover by Doubleday in April 1984. It was reissued in hardcover and trade paperback by Wildside Press in October 2007, and in trade paperback and ebook by the same publisher in April 2016.

Plot
Each volume of the Chronicles of Kylix is set on a different world in the magical solar system of the fictional star Kylix in the constellation of the Unicorn. The system consists of the five planets Zao, Olymbris, Thoorana, Zephrondus and Gulzund. Kellory the Warlock takes place on Zephrondus.

Kellory is the last survivor of the Black Wolves tribe, descended from the Lost Kings of Illyriod. His people were massacred by the Thugoda Horde, who burned his father alive and held his own sword hand in the same fire so he could live to tell the tale but never raise a sword against his tormentors. He dedicates his life to revenge against the horde, becoming a warlock since he is no longer able to be a warrior. In time, he achieves his dark goal.

Reviews
Jackie Cassada in Library Journal writes "[t]hough Kellory himself has a certain grim appeal, there is little in this unsubtle Conan-type adventure to recommend it to anyone other than hard-core sword-and-sorcery fans."

References

External links
Fantastic Fiction entry for Kellory the Warlock
"Kellory the Warlock" - review by Charles R. Rudledge on Singular Points blog, August 25, 2010.
"His Name is Vengeance: Kellory the Warlock by Lin Carter" - review by Fletcher Vredenburgh on blackgate.com, March 18, 2014.

1984 American novels
American fantasy novels
Novels by Lin Carter
Doubleday (publisher) books